Brocas is a French commune.

Brocas may also refer to:

Many members of the Anglo-French Brocas family in Beaurepaire, Hampshire:
Sir Barnard or Bernard Brocas (1330–1395)
Sir Barnard or Bernard Brocas (rebel) (executed 1400) his son
Barnard Brocas, Esq. (d. before 1834) collector, owner of the Brocas helm
Henry Brocas (1762–1837), Irish landscape painter 
Thomas Brocas (fl. 1390–1404), English MP